The Minnesota Senate Republican Caucus is the formal organization of the Republican members of the Minnesota Senate. With 33 members, the current minority leader is Senator Mark Johnson.

Current leadership 
Effective with the start of the 91st Minnesota Legislature, the caucus leadership is as follows:

 Paul Gazelka (Nisswa) as Majority Leader
 Michelle Benson (Ham Lake) as Deputy Majority Leader
 Gary Dahms (Redwood Falls) as Assistant Majority Leader
Karin Housley (St. Marys Point) as Assistant Majority Leader
John Jasinski (Faribault) as Assistant Majority Leader
Warren Limmer (Maple Grove) as Assistant Majority Leader
 Eric Pratt (Prior Lake) as Assistant Majority Leader

List of caucus leaders 
The Republicans have held a majority in the Senate after just two elections since party organization resumed in 1973. The list of caucus leaders is as follows:

Notes

External links 
 Official website

Senate